Maya Elaine Higa (born May 24, 1998) is an American conservationist, falconer, wildlife rehabilitator and Twitch streamer. She is the founder of Alveus Sanctuary, a non-profit exotic animal sanctuary and virtual education center based in Austin, Texas, and the host of the Conservation Cast, a weekly conversation broadcast on Higa's Twitch channel designed to connect her audience and conservationists.

Early life
Maya Elaine Higa was born to a Japanese father and an American mother in Northern California on May 24, 1998, and grew up there on a farm as the youngest sibling with her parents, two brothers, and a sister. She attended California Polytechnic State University in San Luis Obispo, graduating with a bachelor's degree in agricultural education and communication in June 2020.

Career
Higa began streaming on Twitch in February 2019. Her streams consist of various activities such as music and falconry, along with spreading conservation awareness. Early in her streaming career, she saw significant growth after a falconry video with her juvenile red-tailed hawk named Bean went viral on Reddit. After she celebrated her 21st birthday by holding a charity stream for 5 Cities Homeless Coalition, a local homeless coalition that she previously volunteered at, she gained media attention from local news.

In July 2019, Higa started the Conservation Cast, a podcast where viewers learn about animals and gather information from experts such as conservationists, wildlife enthusiasts, and scientific communicators. The first episode of the podcast raised US$3,000 for the American Eagle Foundation. The podcast has also featured speakers from organizations such as Save the Rhino, the Exotic Feline Rescue Center, and the Dian Fossey Gorilla Fund. Conservation Cast has raised more than US$80,000 with 63 episodes for wildlife protection organizations around the globe.

In October 2020, Higa became a part of the Board of Directors for a wildlife rehabilitation center in Central Texas. Her role focuses on raptor rehabilitation and husbandry.

On February 10, 2021, Higa held a 21-hour charity stream for her newly founded non-profit exotic animal sanctuary and virtual education center known as Alveus Sanctuary. The stream was highlighted by an auction that sold off items such as a golden shovel owned by Sodapoppin, Gucci loafers owned by T-Pain, and a signed jersey from xQc. The most expensive item auctioned off was a 1-hour gaming session with streamer and former professional CS:GO player Shroud, purchased by fellow streamer Ludwig Ahgren for $53,000. Shortly after reaching her goal of US$500,000, Higa shaved her head, fulfilling a promise she made a few weeks prior. All together, she raised US$578,000.

In February 2021, Higa officially joined the Make-a-Wish Foundation in Central and South Texas as a governing board member.

In November 2021, Higa began to co-host the Wine About It podcast alongside her friend and fellow Twitch streamer, QTCinderella. Wine About It went on hiatus in September 2022 after Higa announced her “indefinite” break from online content creation.

On March 12, 2022, Higa co-hosted the first Streamer Awards show with QTCinderella at The Fonda Theater in Los Angeles, California.

On March 30, 2022, Higa started Conservation Uncharted, a travel series of live streams focused on different aspects of wildlife conservation, with a whale watching trip joined by Whale and Dolphin Conservation, raising over US$4,000 in under 2 hours.

Using her platform on Twitch, Higa has raised over $1,000,000 collectively from viewer donations.

On January 21, 2023, Higa was announced as an ambassador for the Whale and Dolphin Conservation.

Personal life
Higa began dating fellow Twitch streamer Matthew Rinaudo, also known by his online alias Mizkif, in 2019. On September 14, 2021, Rinaudo announced on Twitter that he and Higa had ended their relationship.

Notes

References

1998 births
Living people
American people of Japanese descent
California Polytechnic State University alumni
American conservationists
Falconry
Twitch (service) streamers
People from Austin, Texas
Organization founders
Non-profit executives
Singer-songwriters from California
Female equestrians
American podcasters